This is a list of rivers of Wales, organised geographically. It is taken anti-clockwise from the Dee Estuary to the M48 Bridge that separates the estuary of the River Wye from the River Severn.

Tributaries are listed down the page in an upstream direction, starting with those closest to the sea. The main stem (or principal) river of a catchment is given, left-bank tributaries are indicated by (L), and right-bank tributaries by (R). Note that, in general usage, the 'left (or right) bank of a river' refers to the left (or right) hand bank as seen when looking downstream. Where a named river is formed by the confluence of two differently named rivers, these are labelled as (Ls) and (Rs) for the left and right forks. A prime example is the formation of the River Taff from the Taf Fawr and the Taf Fechan at Cefn Coed-y-cymmer.

The list includes more or less every watercourse named on Ordnance Survey mapping and thus many of the main rivers of Wales (as defined by Natural Resources Wales ). Difficulties arise otherwise in determining what should and what should not be included.

Certain names are encountered frequently and particular care should be taken to differentiate between the various occurrences of Clydach, Clywedog and of Dulas for example as well as those whose names refer perhaps to the colour of their waters e.g. Afon Goch (red river), Afon Ddu (black/dark river) and Afon Wen (white/light river).

Mainland rivers flowing into Liverpool Bay
From Dee Estuary to Garth Pier, Bangor, Gwynedd

Dee catchment

 River Dee, Wales (Afon Dyfrdwy)
 Nant-y-fflint (L) (flows into Dee Estuary)
 Wepre Brook (L) (flows into Dee Estuary)
 Aldford Brook (R) (wholly in England)
 River Alyn (L) (Afon Alun / River Alun)
 River Cegidog (R) (Afon Cegidog)
 Nant-y-Ffrith (R)
 River Terrig (R) (Afon Terrig)
 Worthenbury Brook (R)
 Emral Brook (Ls)
 Wych Brook (Rs) (formerly known as the "River Elfe")
 Red Brook (L)
 River Clywedog (L) (Afon Clywedog)
 River Gwenfro (L) (Afon Gwenfro)
 Glanyrafon Brook (R)
 Black Brook (R) (Afon Ddu)
 Shell Brook (R)
 River Ceiriog (R) (Afon Ceiriog) (head of river is Ceiriog Ddu)
 River Teirw (L) (Afon Teirw)
 Nant Sarffle (R)
 Nant Cwm-y-geifr (R)
 Nant Cwm-llawenog (R)
 Nant Rhydwilym (R)
 River Eitha (L) (Afon Eitha)
 Eglwyseg River (L)
 Afon Morwynion (L)
 River Alwen (L) (Afon Alwen)
 Afon Ceirw (R)
 Merddwr (R) (known as Nant Lleidiog upstream)
 Afon Medrad (R)
 Afon Brenig (L)
 Afon Trystion (R)
 Afon Llynor (R)
 Afon Ceidiog (R)
 Hirnant (R)
 Afon Tryweryn (L) (River Tryweryn)
 Afon Mynach (Dee) (L)
 Afon Hesgyn (L)
 Afon Gelyn (L) (flows into Llyn Celyn)
 Nant Aberderfel (R) (flows into Llyn Celyn)
 Afon Llafar (L) (flows into Bala Lake)
 Afon Twrch (R)
 Afon Lliw (L)

Clwyd catchment

 River Clwyd (Afon Clwyd)
 Afon Gele (L)
 River Elwy (L) (Afon Elwy)(Also known as Afon Cledwen above the village of Llangernyw)
 Afon Meirchion (R)
 River Aled (R)
 Afon Gallen (Ls)
 River Wheeler (R) (Afon Chwiler)
 Afon Ystrad (R)
 River Clywedog (Clwyd) (L) (Afon Clywedog) (Not to be confused with the Dee tributary of the same name)

Conwy catchment

 River Conwy (Afon Conwy)
 Afon Gyffin (L)
 Afon Roe (L) (known as Afon Tafolog in upper reaches)
 Afon Dulyn (L)
 Afon Ddu (L)
 Afon Garreg-wen (L)
 Ffrwd Cerriguniawn (L)
 Afon Melynllyn (R)
 Afon Porth-llwyd (L)
 Afon Eigiau
 Afon Ddu (L)
 Afon Crafnant (L)
 Afon Geirionydd (R)
 Afon Gallt y Gwg (R)
 Nant y Goron (R)
 Afon Llugwy (L)
 Nantygwryd (R)
 Afon Lledr (L)
 Afon Wybrnant (R)
 Afon Maesgwm (R)
 Afon Ystumiau (L)
 Afon Machno (L)
 Afon Glasgwm (L)
 Afon Iwrch (R)
 Afon Eidda (L)
 Merddwr (R)
 Afon Caletwr (R)
 Afon Serw (R)

Simple coastal catchments

 Afon Gyrach
 Afon Ddu
 Afon Glan-sais (L)
 Afon Maes-y-bryn (R)

Aber catchment

 Afon Aber
 Afon Anafon (Rs)
 Afon Rhaeadr Fawr (Ls)
 Afon Rhaeadr Bach (Ls)
 Afon Gam (L)
 Afon Goch (Rs)

Ogwen catchment

 Afon Ogwen
 Afon Caseg (R)
 Afon Llafar (L)
 Afon Denau (flows into Llyn Ogwen)
 Nant Gwern y Gof (L)
 Afon Lloer (flows into Llyn Ogwen)

Cegin catchment

 River Cegin (Afon Cegin)

Adda catchment

 River Adda (Afon Adda)

Isle of Anglesey rivers
Anticlockwise from Menai Bridge / Porthaethwy

Minor coastal catchments

Afon Cadnant (River Cadnant)
 Nant Meigan
 Lleiniog
 Afon Nodwydd
 Afon y Marchogion
 Afon Lligwy
 Nant Perfedd
 Afon Goch (Dulas)
 Nant y Beddyw
 Afon Bryn Gwyn
 Afon Goch (Amlwch)
 Afon Wygyr
 Gwter Fudr
 Afon Alaw (River Alaw)

Crigyll catchment

 Afon Crigyll
 Afon Caradog (L)

Ffraw catchment

 Afon Ffraw
 Afon Frechwen (L)
 Afon Gwna (flows into Llyn Coron)

Cefni catchment

 Afon Cefni (River Cefni)
 Afon Newydd (L)
 Afon Ceint (L)
 Afon Erddreiniog (L) (flows into Cefni Reservoir)

Braint (i) catchment
The Afon Braint bifurcates near Llanfairpwllgwyngyll to form two different watercourses.
 Afon Braint (River Braint, Dwyran)
 Afon Rhyd y Valley (L)

Braint (ii) catchment

 Afon Braint (LlanfairPG)
 Afon Rhyd Eilian (L)

Note "Afon Menai", known as the "Menai Strait" in English, is not technically a river, despite its Welsh name..

Mainland rivers flowing into the Menai Strait and Caernarfon Bay
From Bangor Pier to the tip of the Llŷn Peninsula

Seiont catchment

 Afon Seiont (River Seiont) (known as Afon Rhythallt above Pont-Rhythallt)
 Afon Nant Peris (flows into Llyn Peris)
 Afon Arddu (L)

Gwyrfai catchment

 Afon Gwyrfai
 Afon Carrog (L)
 Afon Rhŷd (R)

Simple coastal catchments

 Afon Llifon
 Afon Llyfni, Lleyn
 Afon Desach
 Afon Hen 
 Nant Gwrtheyrn
 Afon Geirch 
 Afon Amwlch 
 Afon Pen-y-graig

Rivers flowing into Cardigan Bay
From the tip of the Llŷn Peninsula to St. David's Head
 Afon Saint

Daron catchment
 Afon Daron
 Afon Cyllyfelin (R)

Soch catchment

 Afon Soch
 Afon Horon (L)

Rhyd-hir catchment etc

 Afon Rhyd-hir
 Afon Penrhos (R)
 Afon Erch
 Afon Wen

Dwyfor catchment

 Afon Dwyfor
 Afon Dwyfach (R)
 Afon Henwy (L)

Glaslyn catchment

 Afon Glaslyn
 Afon Dylif
 Afon Croesor (L)
 Nantmor (L)
 Afon Colwyn (R)
 Afon Llynedno (L)
 Afon Dwyryd (Headwaters are disputed to be the Afon Goedol)
 Afon y Glyn (L)
 Afon Prysor (L)
 Afon Cynfal (L)
 Afon Teigl (L)
 Afon Bowydd
 Afon Tafarn Helyg

Artro catchment

 Afon Artro
 Afon Cwmnantcol (L)

Ysgethin catchment

Afon Ysgethin

Mawddach catchment

 Afon Mawddach
 Afon Dwynant (R)
 Afon Gwynant (L)
 Afon Cwm-llechen (R)
 Afon Cwm-mynach (R)
 Afon Wnion (L)
 Afon Clywedog (L)
 Afon Celynog (L)
 Afon Wen (L)
 Afon Gamlan (R)
 Afon Eden (R)
 Afon Crawcwellt (R)
 Afon Gain (R)

Dysynni catchment

 Afon Dysynni (R)
 Afon Fathew (L)
 Afon Cadair (R)
 Nant Gwernol (L)

Dyfi catchment

 River Dyfi (River Dovey)
 Afon Leri (L)
 Afon Ceulan (R)
 Afon Einion (L)
 Afon Llyfnant (L)
 Afon Dulas (R) (North Dulas)
 Afon Deri (R)
 Nant Ceiswyn (R)
 Afon Dulas (L) (South Dulas)
 Afon Twymyn (L)
 Afon Rhiwsaeson (R)
 Afon Laen (L)
 Afon Angell (R)
 Afon Cleifion (L)
 Afon Dugoed (Rs)
 Afon Tafolog (Ls)
 Afon Cerist (R)
 Afon Cywarch (R)

Clarach catchment

 Afon Clarach (formed at the confluence of Afon Stewi and Nant Silo)
 Bowstreet Brook (R)
 Afon Peithyll (Ls)

Rheidol catchment

 River Rheidol (Afon Rheidol)
 Afon Melindwr (R)
 River Mynach (L) (Afon Mynach)
 Afon Merin (Rs)
 Nant Rhuddnant (Ls)
 Afon Castell (L)
 Afon Llechwedd Mawr (flows into Nant y Moch Reservoir)
 Afon Lluestgota (R)
 Afon Hengwm (flows into Nant y Moch Reservoir)
 Afon Hyddgen (R)
 Nant-y-moch (stream flowing into Nant-y-moch Reservoir)

Ystwyth catchment

 River Ystwyth (Afon Ystwyth)
 Afon Fâd (L)
 Afon Llanfihangel (R)
 Nant Cynon (Ls)
 Afon Magwr (R)
 Nant Freuo (L)
 Nant Pant-yr-Haidd (R)
 Nant Cwmtarw (L)
 Nant Cwm-nel (L)
 Nant Cilmeddu (L)
 Nant y Henfelin (L)
 Nant yr Brithyll (R)
 Nant y Berws (L)
 Nant Cell (R)
 Nant Lledwenau (R)
 Nant Bwlchgwallter (L)
 Nant Peiran (R)
 Nant Crafanglach (R)
 Nant Perfedd (L)
 Nant Ffrin-fawr (Rs)
 Nant Hylles (L)
 Nant Gau (L)
 Nant Ffrwd-ddu (L)
 Nant Cae-glas (R)
 Nant y Gwndwn-gwyn (Ls)
 Nant Cwta (Rs)
 Nant Milwyn (L)
 Nant Byr (L)
 Nant y Gwaith (R)
 Nant Watcyn (R)
 Nant yr Onnen (R)
 Nant Cwm-du (L)
 Nant Stwc (R)
 Nant Penygwndwn (L)
 Nant Garw (R)
 Nant y Cae Isaf (L)
 Nant y Cae (L)
 Nant Troedyrhiw (R)
 Afon Diliw (R)
 Nant yr Gafod (R)
 Diliw Fechan (R)
 Nant y Caseg (L)
 Nant yr Eglwys
 Nant yr Eglwys-fach (L)
 Nant Lwyd (R)
 Nant y Gorlan (Rs)
 Nant Llychese (R)
 Nant Rhydyfelin (L)
 Nant Ffos-casaf (L)

Wyre catchment

 Afon Wyre
 Afon Carrog (R)
 Wyre Fach (L)
 Nant Rhydrosser (L)
 Afon Tryal (L)
 Afon Beidog (L)

Cledan catchment

 Afon Cledan

Arth catchment

 River Arth

Aeron catchment

 Afon Aeron
 Afon Mydr (L)
 Gwenffrwd (R)

Coastal streams

 Afon Drywi
 Afon Soden
 Afon Fynnon Ddewi
 Nant Hawen
 Hoffnant

Teifi catchment

 River Teifi (Afon Teifi)
 Afon Piliau (L)
 Nant Arberth (R)
 Afon Cych (L)
 Afon Dulas (L)
 Afon Pedran (L)
 Afon Sylgen (R)
 Afon Hirwaun (R)
 Nant Elfed (R)
 Afon Ceri (R)
 Afon Dulas (Lampeter) (R)
 Afon Bedw (L)
 Nant Bargod (L)
 Afon Tyweli (L)
 Afon Talog (R)
 Afon Clettwr (P)
 Clettwr Fawr (Rs)
 Clettwr Fach (Ls)
 Nant Cledlyn (R)
 Afon Duar (L)
 Afon Granell (R)
 Afon Dulas (Llandyssul) (R)
 Afon Denys (R)
 Nant Clywedog (L)
 Clywedog-isaf (Ls)
 Clywedog-ganol (Rs)
 Clywedog-uchaf (R)
 Afon Brefi (L)
 Nant Bryn-maen (R)
 Afon Berwyn (L)
 Afon Groes (R)
 Afon Fflur (L)
 Camddwr (R)
 Afon Meurig (R)
 Nant Lluest (R)
 Glasffrwd (L)
 Nant Egnant (L)
 Nant Rhydol (R)

Nyfer catchment etc

 Afon Nyfer
 Nant Duad (R)
 Afon Brynberian (L)
 Afon Bannon (L)

Minor coastal catchments

 River Gwaun (Afon Gwaun)
 River Aer (L)

Rivers flowing to west Pembrokeshire coast
From St David's Head to St. Govan's Head

Minor catchments
 River Alun
 River Solva (Afon Solfach)
 Brandy Brook

Cleddau catchment

 Daugleddau (estuary is Daugleddyf or Milford Haven downstream)
 Pembroke River (L)
 Carew River (L)
 Cresswell River (L)
 Western Cleddau (Rs)
 Millin Brook (L)
 Merlin's Brook (R)
 Cartlett Brook (L)
 Knock Brook (R)
 Camrose Brook (R)
 Rudbaxton Water (L)
 Spittal Brook (L)
 Nant-y-coy Brook (R)
 Afon Anghof (L)
 Afon Glan-rhyd (R)
 Nant y Bugail (L)
 Afon Cleddau (upper reaches of Western Cleddau)
 Eastern Cleddau (Ls)
Afon Syfynwy (R)
 Afon Wern (R)

Rivers flowing into the Bristol Channel
From St. Govan's Head to M48 Bridge

Taf catchment

 River Tâf (Afon Taf)
 River Cywyn (Afon Cywyn) (L)
 Afon Cynin (L)
 Afon Dewi Fawr (L)
 Afon Sien (R)
 Afon Fenni (R)
 Afon Gronw (L)
 Afon Marlais (R)

Towy catchment

 Afon Tywi (River Towy)
 Afon Gwili (R)
 Afon Annell (R)
 River Cothi (R) (Afon Cothi)
 Afon Gorlech (R)
 Afon Twrch (R)
 Afon Marlais (R)
 Afon Dulas (R)
 Afon Cennen (L)
 Afon Sawdde (L)
 Afon Bran (L)
 Afon Ydw (R)
 Afon Dulais (R)
 Afon Brân (L)
Cynnant Fawr (Rs)
Cynnant Fach (L)
Afon Lwynor (Ls)
 Afon Crychan (L)
 Afon Gwydderig (L)
 Afon Gwenlais (R)
 Gwenffrwd (R)
 Nant Melyn (R)
 Afon Doethie (R)
 Afon Pysgotwr Fawr (R)
 Afon Pysgotwr Fach (R)
 Camddwr (R)

Gwendraeth catchment

 River Gwendraeth
 Gwendraeth Fach (Rs)
 Gwendraeth Fawr (Ls)

Lliedi catchment

 River Lliedi (Afon Lliedi)

Loughor catchment

 River Loughor (Afon Llwchwr)
 Burry Pill (L)
 Afon Lliw (L)
 Afon Llan (L)
 Afon Gwili (R)
 River Amman (L)
 Afon Lash (R)
 Afon Morlais (R)
 Afon Dulais
 Afon Camffrwd

Clyne catchment
 Clyne River

Tawe catchment

 River Tawe
 Nant y fendrod (L)
 Lower Clydach River (R)
 Upper Clydach River (R)
 River Egel (L)
 Afon Twrch (R)
 Nant Gwys (L)
 Gwys Fawr (Ls)
 Gwys Fach (Rs)
 Nant Llynfell (R)
 Nant y Llyn (R)
 River Giedd (R)
 Nant Cyw (L)
 Nant Ceiliog (L)
 Nant Llech (L)
Nant Llech Pellaf (L)
 River Haffes (R)
 Nant Byfre (L)
 Nant y Llyn (R)

Neath catchment

 River Neath
 River Clydach (R)
 River Dulais (R)
 Melin Cwrt Brook (L)
 Clydach Brook (L)
 Nedd Fechan (Rs)
 Afon Pyrddin (R)
 Afon Mellte (Ls)
 Sychryd(L)
 Afon Hepste (L)
 Afon Llia (Rs)
 Afon Dringarth (Ls)

Afan catchment

 River Afan
 Ffrwd Wyllt (L)
 Nant Cwm Wenderi
 Afon Pelenna (R)
 Nant Cregan
 Afon Corrwg (R)
 Afon Corrwg Fechan (R)

Kenfig catchment

 River Kenfig (Afon Cynffig)

Ogmore catchment

 River Ogmore (Afon Ogwr)
 River Ewenny (L)
 Afon Alun (L)
 Afon Ewenny Fach (L)
 Nant Canna (L)
 Nant Crymlyn (R)
 River Llynfi (R)
 Nant y Gadlys (R)
 Nant Cwm-du (L)
 Afon Garw (R)
 Afon Ogwr Fawr (Rs)
 Afon Ogwr Fach (Ls)
 Nant Iechyd (R)

Col-huw catchment

 Afon Col-huw
 Ogney Brook (Rs)
 Hoddnant (Ls)
 Boverton Brook (Ls)
 Llanmaes Brook (Rs)

Thaw catchment

 River Thaw
 Kenson River (L)
 River Waycock (Ls)
 Nant Llancarfan (Rs)
 Nant y Stepsau (R)

Cadoxton catchment

 Cadoxton River
 Sully Brook (L)
 Cold Brook, Cadoxton (R)
 Nant yr Argae (L)
 East Brook, Cadoxton (L)
 Bullcroft Brook (Ls)
 Wrinstone Brook (Rs)

Taff catchment

 River Taff (Afon Taf)
 River Ely (Afon Elái) (R)
 Afon Clun (L) (Nant Myddlyn in upper reaches)
 River Rhondda (R) (Afon Rhondda)
 Rhondda Fawr (Ls)
 Rhondda Fach (Rs)
 River Ritec (Afon Ritec)
 Nant Clydach (R)
 River Cynon (R) (Afon Cynon)
 Aman River
 Afon Dar
 Afon Pennar
 Bargoed Taf (L)
 Nant Morlais
 Taf Fechan (Ls)
 Nant Ffrwd (Rs)

Rhymney catchment

 Rhymney River (Afon Rhymni)
 Nant Bargod Rhymni (R)

Usk catchment

 River Usk (Afon Wysg)
 Ebbw River (R) (Afon Ebwy)
 Sirhowy River (R)
 River Ebbw Fach (L)
 Afon Llwyd (R)
 Sôr Brook (R)
 Olway Brook (L)
 Berthin Brook (R)
 Afon Gafenni (L) (River Gavenny)
Afon Cibi (R)
 River Clydach (R)
 Grwyne Fawr (L)
 Grwyne Fechan (R)
 Rhiangoll (L)
 Nant Cleisfer (R)
 Afon Crawnon (R)
 Caerfanell (R)
 Nant Menasgin (R)
 Afon Cynrig (R)
 River Honddu (L)
 Afon Tarell (R)
 Nant Cwm Llwch
 Afon Ysgir (L)
 Nant Brân (L)
 Afon Cilieni (L)
 Afon Senni (R)
 Afon Crai (R)
 Afon Hydfer (R)

Wye catchment

 River Wye (Afon Gwy)
 River Trothy (R)
 River Monnow (Afon Mynwy) (R)
 River Dore (L)
 Dulas Brook (R)
 Worm Brook (L)
 River Honddu (R)
 Olchon Brook (R)
 Escley Brook (L)
 River Lugg (L) (Afon Llugwy)
 River Frome (L)
 River Kenwater
 River Arrow (R)
 Cynon Brook
 Gilwern Brook
 Gladestry Brook
 Dulas Brook (R)
 Afon Llynfi (R)
 River Ennig (R)
 Dulas (L)
 Triffrwd (L)
 Bachawy (L)
 Afon Edw (L)
 Duhonw (R)
 Afon Irfon (R)
 Afon Chwerfri (L)
 Dulas (L)
 Afon Cammarch (L)
 Afon Dulas (R)
 Afon Gwesyn (L)
 Dulas Brook (L)
 River Ithon (L) (Afon Ieithon)
 Dulas (R)
 Clywedog Brook (R)
 Afon Aran (L)
 Camddwr (L)
 Afon Elan (R)
 Afon Claerwen (R)
 Rhiwnant (R)
 Afon Arban (R)
 Afon Claerddu (R)
 Afon Gwngu (R)
 Afon Marteg (L)
 Afon Bidno (L)
 Afon Tarennig (R)

Severn catchment

With the exception of a small part of the Rea Brook, all tributaries of the Severn downstream of the confluence of the Severn and the Vyrnwy are wholly in England. For details see List of rivers of England.
 River Severn (Afon Hafren), Bristol Channel (Mor Hafren)
 Rea Brook (R) (small parts of upper catchment in Wales)
 River Vyrnwy (L) (Afon Efyrnwy) (lowermost section in England)
 Afon Tanat (L) (lowermost section in England)
 Cynllaith (L) (part forms the border between Wales and England)
 Afon Ogau
 Afon Iwrch (L)
 Afon Rhaeadr (L)
 Afon Eirth (L)
 Afon Cain (L)
 Nant Fyllon (Ls)
 Nant Alan (Rs)
 Afon Banwy (R) (a.k.a. Afon Einion)
 Afon Einion (R)
 Afon Gam (R)
 Afon Twrch (L)
 Maerdy Brook (L)
 New Cut/Guilsfield Brook (L)
 Luggy Brook (L)
 Camlad (R) (partly in England)
 River Rhiw (Afon Rhiw) (L)
 Afon Rhiw (north fork) (Rs)
 Afon Rhiw (south fork)(Ls)
 Llifior Brook (L)
 The Mule (R) (Afon Miwl)
 Bechan Brook (L)
 Mochdre Brook (R)
 Nant Rhyd-ros lan??
 Afon Carno (L)
 Afon Cerniog (R)
 Afon Cledan (R)
 Afon Trannon (L)
 Afon Cerist (R)
 Colwyn Brook (L)
 Nant Feinion (R)
 Wigdwr Brook (L)
 Afon Clywedog (L)
 Afon Biga (R) (flows into Clywedog Reservoir)
 Afon Llwyd (R) (flows into Clywedog Reservoir)
 Afon Dulas (R)
 Afon Brochan (L)
 Nant Cydros (R)
 Rhydyclwydau Brook (R)

Longest rivers in Wales
This is a table of the longest rivers wholly or partially in Wales.
Rivers only partly in Wales are included in this table in italics. Note that river lengths given by different authorities vary due to the different ways in which the measurement is made or indeed estimated. That rivers are partly fractal in nature accounts for some variation and lengths can also vary slightly over time as meanders expand or are cut off where rivers run through broad flood-plains.

See also
 List of rivers of the United Kingdom
 List of rivers of England
 List of rivers in Ireland
 List of rivers of the Isle of Man
 List of rivers in Scotland
 Longest rivers of the United Kingdom
 Main river

References

Wales
 
Rivers of Wales
Wales